The Istana Bandar is a historical palace in Jugra, Kuala Langat District, Selangor, Malaysia.

History
It was built in 1899. The then-Sultan of Selangor, Sultan Alaeddin Sulaiman Shah, whose official residence was in Klang, still frequented this palace for Friday prayers at the mosque next to this palace. It was mothballed after his death in 1938. This palace is also the place the 7th Sultan, Sultan Salahuddin Abdul Aziz Shah, was born.

Chinese workers (originally from nearby mining activities) were recruited for the construction project of this palace.

Transportation
There is a Smart Selangor bus stop about 2 km south from the palace, served by Smart Selangor bus route BTG 2. The bus connects to Banting town. 

From Banting town, route BTG 1 connects to Kuala Lumpur International Airport and  Salak Tinggi ERL (Airport Express) station. Other routes, e.g. 730 connect to Klang.

References

Kuala Langat District
Royal residences in Malaysia
History of Selangor
Buildings and structures in Selangor